Nasiruddin Mahmud may refer to:

 Nasir ad-Din Mahmud I (r. 1092-1094), Sultan of the Seljuk Empire
 Nasir al-Din Mahmud (r. 1201-1222), Bey of the Artuqids
 Nasir ad-Din Mahmud (r. 1219-1234), Zengid emir of Mosul
 Nasiruddin Mahmud (eldest son of Iltutmish) (r. 1227–1229), a governor of Bengal under the Delhi Sultanate
 Nasiruddin Mahmud Shah, Sultan of Delhi (r. 1246–1265)
 Nasir-ud-Din Mahmud Shah Tughluq (r. 1394–1413), Sultan of Delhi
 Mahmud Shah (Sultan of Bengal) (r. 1435–1459)

See also
An-Nasir Muhammad bin Abdallah (1196-1226), Zaidi imam of Yemen
Nasir al-Din Muhammad (r. 1261-1318), Mihrabanid malik of Sistan 
Nasir-ad-Din Muhammad (r. 1293-194), Sultan of Egypt and Syria
Al-Nasir Muhammad Salah al-Din (r. 1372-1391), Zaidi imam of Yemen
Nasir ud din Muhammad Shah III (r. 1390-1394), Tughlaq sultan of Delhi
An-Nasir ad-Din Muhammad (r. 1421-1422), Mamluk sultan of Egypt
An-Nasir Muhammad bin Yusuf (r. 1474-1488), Zaidi imam of Yemen
An-Nasir Muhammad ibn Qaitbay (r. 1496-1498), Mamluk sultan of Egypt
An-Nasir Muhammad (Zaidi imam) (1680-1754)